The Estrela River is a river of Rio de Janeiro state in southeastern Brazil. It flows in Guanabara Bay.

See also
List of rivers of Rio de Janeiro

References
Brazilian Ministry of Transport

Rivers of Rio de Janeiro (state)